Les Griggs (6 May 1914 – 28 May 1990) was an Australian rules footballer who played with Essendon in the Victorian Football League (VFL) during the 1930s and 1940s.

Griggs, from Yarragon originally, was mostly a centreman and centre half forward over the course of his career at Essendon. A teacher, he missed a couple of seasons due to his work, costing him a place in the 100 club as he finished his career with 99 games. He had his best year in 1941 when he kicked 29 goals and played in Essendon's losing Grand Final team. Griggs also acted as caretaker coach for one game that year.

References

Holmesby, Russell and Main, Jim (2007). The Encyclopedia of AFL Footballers. 7th ed. Melbourne: Bas Publishing.

1914 births
1990 deaths
Australian rules footballers from Victoria (Australia)
Essendon Football Club players
Essendon Football Club coaches